Narsata (Narhata) is a rural locality (an ulus) in Mukhorshibirsky District, Republic of Buryatia, Russia. The population was 349 as of 2010. There are 7 streets.

Geography 
Narsata is located 58 km north of Mukhorshibir (the district's administrative centre) by road. Galtay is the nearest rural locality.

References 

Rural localities in Mukhorshibirsky District